Costas Kondylis (1940 – August 18, 2018) was an American architect. He designed over 85 buildings in New York City, many of them for real-estate developer and later U.S. president Donald Trump, through his eponymous architectural firm.

Kondylis was born in Burundi, where his parents were European colonists who came from Greece, Vassiliki and Andreas Kondylis, who opened a chain of general stores in East Africa. Kondylis attended a boarding school there and attained master's degrees in Europe and the United States, respectively at the University of Geneva and at Columbia University. After receiving his master's degrees in 1967, Kondylis worked at Davis, Brody & Associates, and then at Philip Birnbaum & Associates. In 1989, Kondylis created Costas Kondylis Architects; the firm's work was featured in several magazines and was the subject of a television documentary. The company was renamed Costas Kondylis and Partners LLP in 2000, when several of the firm's architects became partners in the organization including Alan Goldstein, L. Stephen Hill, Marta Rudzka, and David West. The company, which was headquartered in New York City, dissolved in 2009. Afterward, he created another firm called Kondylis Design. Kondylis died on August 18, 2018, of undisclosed causes.

Works
Kondylis was known for his conventional designs of skyscrapers in Manhattan, at a time when developers were either building low-rises or unconventional high-rises. He created 86 residential towers in Manhattan over the course of his career. From 2000 to 2007, it was estimated that he designed one residential building in Manhattan every six weeks on average. A 2007 New York Times profile noted that Kondylis had designed 75 projects in New York City and was designing 15 more at the time.

Some of Kondylis's projects were controversial. The 90-story Trump World Tower in Turtle Bay, Manhattan, New York City, was opposed by nearby residents and the United Nations, whose headquarters were located nearby. However, the tower was built without further controversy.

New York metropolitan area projects 
 Riverside South 
 Silver Towers (2009)
 Trump International Hotel and Tower
 Trump World Tower (2001)
 Trump Park Avenue
 The Caroline
 Trump Plaza
 279 Central Park West
 The Anthem 
 The Strathmore
 One Riverview (Newark)
 The Grand Tier (Glenwood Management)
 1049 5th Avenue
 Manhattan Place
 50 Rector Park

See also 

 Architecture of New York City
 List of architecture firms

References

External links 
 A conversation with Costas Kondylis - Hellenic News of America
 New York City residential buildings by Costas Kondylis & Partners LLP - illustrated list of buildings
 Costas Kondylis Design list of buildings on The Skyscraper Center - CTBUH database 
 1 Man, 86 Stories, Building Stories

1940 births
2018 deaths
Architects from New York City
American people of Greek descent
Business career of Donald Trump
Culture of Manhattan
Year of establishment missing